Denkada is a village in Vizianagaram district of the Indian state of Andhra Pradesh, India. Denkada is located on the banks of River Champavathi.

References 

Villages in Vizianagaram district
Mandal headquarters in Vizianagaram district